Walker Falls is a 45-foot cascading waterfall in Buncombe County, North Carolina. Its ease of access makes it a popular destination for waterfall hunters.  It is in a region of Buncombe County that has a large number of small waterfalls and several larger falls.

Natural history
The falls are located on Walker Branch in the Pisgah National Forest near Barnardsville, North Carolina.

Visiting the Falls
The falls is viewable on the side of the road.  To view the falls, from the intersection of NC 197 and Dillingham Rd. in Barnardsville and go 2.2 miles on Dillingham Rd. to a fork in the road.  Take the left fork and go 2.7 miles, when the road turns to gravel and becomes Forest Road 74.  Go 2.8 miles more to see a small sliding waterfall.  1.3 miles later, you will come up on Walker Falls.  You may then go 4.7 miles further down Forest Road 74 to the parking area for Douglas Falls.

If you are coming from the Blue Ridge Parkway, follow Forest Road 63 (if it is not gated) to Dillingham Road.  Turn right, and in 1.4 miles you will reach the point where the road becomes Forest Road 74.  Continue following the directions as above.

Note: Dillingham Rd. only has one way in and out. If you do not plan to visit the falls further down Dillingham Rd. you'll need to go back out the way you entered.

Nearby Falls
 Several Unnamed Falls
 Douglas Falls
 Glassmine Falls
 Mitchell Falls
 Setrock Creek Falls
 Roaring Fork Falls
 Whiteoak Creek Falls

References

External links
Craggy Gardens Page at NCWaterfalls.com

Protected areas of Buncombe County, North Carolina
Waterfalls of North Carolina
Pisgah National Forest
Landforms of Buncombe County, North Carolina